The Hightstown Industrial Track is a rail line in New Jersey, owned and operated by Conrail Shared Assets Operations (CSAO). The line runs from Jamesburg, New Jersey to the current end of track at Cranbury, New Jersey. The line was built by the Camden & Amboy Railroad (C&A) one of the first railroads in the country. It has been operated by C&A, the Pennsylvania Railroad, Penn Central, and finally, Conrail.

History

Beginnings (1832–1871)

The line's history starts on December 17, 1832 with the opening of the Camden and Amboy Railroad between South Amboy and Bordentown. The railroad, which followed the same route as the Hightstown Industrial Track today, was built to convey passengers between New York and Philadelphia. However, passengers had to transfer to either stagecoaches or ferries at the ends of the line to reach the cities themselves. On September 9, 1833, the line's steam locomotive, the John Bull, entered service, starting its run in South Amboy. On the return Journey, it derailed in Hightstown when it hit a hog. Also that fall, the line between Bordentown and Delanco was completed, bringing the southern terminus closer to Philadelphia. Finally, on December 29, 1834, the line was completed to Camden. From then until 1839, operations continued unchanged, but on the first day of 1839, the company completed a line between New Brunswick and Trenton, which connected with the United New Jersey Railroad and Canal Company in New Brunswick. This allowed trains to go straight to Jersey City, greatly lessening the importance of the line through Hightstown and Cranbury. From then on, operations remained unchanged, save for the creation of the junction in Jamesburg with the Freehold and Jamesburg Agricultural Railroad (now the Freehold Secondary). Corporately, the Camden and Amboy and the New Jersey Railroad were officially merged on February 1, 1867. On December 1, 1871, the Pennsylvania Railroad leased the properties of the two railroads (by then amalgamated into the United Canal & Railroad Companies of New Jersey), and split its properties into two divisions; the Amboy, which contained the original Camden and Amboy main line and the New York, which included the main line of the NJRR.

PRR/PC Ownership (1871–1976)

Under the Pennsylvania, the line was relegated to secondary status, owing to the parallel Northeast Corridor. However, north of Jamesburg, the line was electrified, so coal trains could run from Harrisburg straight through to the coal dumpers at South Amboy with electric power. South of Jamesburg, the line was never electrified. In the early 1960s, the line was severed between Hightstown and Windsor, to save money on taxes and to save on maintenance costs. For the first time since 1832, the Camden and Amboy main line was not a through route. The northern part of the line is now the Hightstown Industrial Track. By that time, the northeastern railroad industry was in crisis, with trucks taking their toll on traffic, and the railroads saddled with unprofitable operations. And in 1968, the Pennsylvania merged with the New York Central, forming the Penn Central. In 1976, after eight disastrous years of operation, Conrail absorbed the PC, along with half a dozen other ailing northeastern railroads.

Conrail (1976–present)

Conrail, which has operated the Hightstown Industrial Track since the death of Penn Central, has made relatively few changes to the line. Indeed, all they have done is abandoned it south of Cranbury in 1983, when traffic south of that point dried up. In 1999, during the split of Conrail between CSX and Norfolk Southern, the line was conveyed to Conrail Shared Assets Operations, who operates it to this day. 
The line is served by Conrail Local Freight WPSA-31 (Wayfreight Philadelphia division SAyreville - 31) on Mondays and Wednesdays.
Customers include:
Tyler Distribution, Monroe, receives Misc. boxcars.
Berry Global, Monroe, receives plastic pellets.
NJ-CAL Warehouse, Monroe, receives Misc. boxcars.

References

Rail infrastructure in New Jersey